Andi Bell (born 1972) is a three-time winner of the World Memory Championships. He used a method similar to method of loci.

References

Living people
British mnemonists
1972 births
Place of birth missing (living people)
Date of birth missing (living people)